Willaston School was an educational establishment in Nantwich set up to educate the sons of impoverished Unitarian ministers. The building is currently used as accommodation for students at Reaseheath College.

Philip Barker came from a family of tanners, living at the Grove, Nantwich. In 1894 he gave provision in his will for Wollaston School, which was built next to the Grove. Barker's former home became the headmaster's residence. A local MP John Brunner laid the foundation stone in 1899. The school opened in 1900 with 22 pupils, primarily drawn from Unitarian families.

Prominent pupils
Willaston School had a number of prominent pupils:
 Brian Freeston, colonial governor
 Robert de Zouche Hall, colonial governor
 Alan Sterling Parkes, scientist and Fellow of the Royal Society.
 Norman Ebbutt, foreign correspondent of The Times
 William Mellor founding member of the Communist Party of Great Britain, and editor of The Daily Herald

References

Nantwich